Otto Liebermann (24 November 1898 – 6 April 1974) was the first scientist to describe the low-temperature synthesis of dolomite in a reproducible laboratory experiment.

Works
Liebermann, O. (1967): Synthesis of dolomite. Nature, vol.213, pp. 241–245.

Further reading
 Anonymous: O. Liebermann D. Ph.  Paint Technology, 1963, vol.27, no.4, pp. 34–35.
 Anonymous: Working methods of a paint laboratory.  Paint Technology, 1963, vol.27, no.7, pp. 36–42 (featuring several photographs of Dr. O. Liebermann at work).
 Deelman, J. C. (2011): A tribute to Otto Liebermann , pp. 481–482, in: Low-temperature formation of dolomite and magnesite.
 For a broader perspective on the rise of the oil industry in Austrian Galicia, see: Frank, Alison Fleig (2005): Oil Empire: Visions of prosperity in Austrian Galicia. (Harvard Historical Studies 149) Harvard University Press, Cambridge Mass., 366 p.  .

Austrian chemists
1898 births
1974 deaths
People interned in the Isle of Man during World War II